Francis Henry Jenks (June 2, 1838 – December 9, 1894) was a 19th-century theater critic in Boston whose work appeared in the Boston Globe, The Boston Daily Advertiser, The Boston Courier and  The Boston Evening Transcript newspapers, The New England magazine, Grove Dictionary of Music and Musicians, and other publications.

Jenks  was music and dramatic editor  of The Boston Evening Transcript from 1881 to 1894.  
Jenks donated a number of theater-related items to the collection of the Boston Athenæum.

References

American theater critics
Boston Daily Advertiser people
Boston Evening Transcript people
1838 births
1894 deaths
19th-century American journalists
American male journalists
19th-century American male writers